The Santo Rosario de Pasig Church, formerly Immaculate Conception Cathedral Parish, is a Roman Catholic church in Pasig, Philippines. The jurisdiction of the parish is as follows:  Santolan (North), Marikina River (West), Maybunga San Miguel (South), Cainta, Rizal (East). The church enshrines the 19th century Virgin Mary, said to be different among others, for she has a moon underneath her feet.

The parish is one of the three other parishes in the Diocese of Pasig that has been granted the special papal blessing to mark its Jubilee Year in connection with its 50th anniversary.

History of the parish

Early years
Fr. Victor de Clerck built the first chapel at the site in 1955.

During those times, farming and clay-pot making were the residents' primary means of livelihood. The number of residents increased and the mode of living changed when new factories and residential subdivisions were constructed.

1963–1967
On February 23, 1963, the late Archbishop of Manila, His Excellency Rufino Cardinal Santos created a decree that erected the Parish of Santo Rosario de Pasig and separated it from the Immaculate Conception Parish. It was in the same year when Fr. Vicente M. Planta was installed as its first Parish Priest. He led the formation of different organizations like Legion of Mary, Catholic Women’s League, Young Christian Workers and other groups. He stayed at the Philippine Orthopedic Center now National Orthopedic Hospital, since there was no rectory at that time.

In 1965, the Archdiocese of Manila bought 2,000 square meters of lot. Two hectares of it was donated to the parishes of Cainta and Sto. Rosario for agricultural purposes.

1967–1979
Fr. Teodoro Perez was installed as the new Parish Priest in 1967. There was still no rectory, so he stayed at the Immaculate Concepcion Parish in Pasig for half a year.

On February 10, 1967, a new church and convent were built after selling the lot acquired from the Immaculate Concepcion Parish in Pasig, fund-raising, and participation of the Pastoral Council under Sebastian Sandoval. J. Mijares Constructions won the bid to construct it.

On October 10, 1970, the first mass was held under the supervision of the Parish Council headed by Oscar F. Zapanta. The late Archbishop of Manila, Rufino Cardinal Santos blessed the church on February 29, 1971 under the Patronage of Our Lady of the Holy Rosary. The feast day is celebrated on a Sunday closest to October 7.

Renovations

1987–1991
A 3-storey building beside the church was completed under  Rev. Fr. Julio Cesar M. Manalo's tenure as a Parish Priest.

1991–1996
The Blessed Sacrament Chapel was constructed and blessed by Bishop Protacio G. Gungon on September 4, 1992. The church's facade was improved by the Adoracion Nocturna Filipina - Rosario Chapter. Church repainting was also done.

1996–2000
The altar was repainted and the entire church and rectory were remodelled.

Architecture of the Present Church
The church has undergone a lot of renovations. At present, it is a modernized structure with art deco design. Walls are made of concrete. The church has a high ceiling that promotes ventilation and steel framing to support its structure. Since it is well-lighted, it doesn't need artificial lighting at daytime. Stained glass is used for the windows.

Pilgrim Church
Sto. Rosario de Pasig was declared a Pilgrim Church by Pope Francis in a papal decree dated April 17, 2013 to mark its 50th anniversary and to celebrate the Jubilee year which will end on October 7, 2014. The Church's Jubilee Door is symbolic of the entrance of the pilgrims to the historic Jubilee Year. The other three Pilgrim Churches covered by the Pasig diocese are the Shrine of Saint Anne in Santa Ana, Taguig; Parish of Santo Tomas de Villanueva in Santolan, Pasig; and Our Lady of the Holy Rosary Parish in Lower Bicutan, Taguig.

Gallery

References

External links 

Diocese of Pasig

Buildings and structures in Pasig
Roman Catholic churches in Metro Manila